Hunteria zeylanica grows as either an evergreen shrub or as a tree up to  tall, with a trunk diameter of up to . Its flowers feature a white corolla. The berries are yellow. Its habitat is forests from sea level to  altitude. The trees can withstand salinity. Local medicinal uses include for stomach-ache. Hunteria zeylanica wood is used for weapon handles and as firewood. In Africa, the plant is native to Kenya and Tanzania and in Asia it is native to China, India, Sri Lanka, Indochina and western Malesia.

References

zeylanica
Plants used in traditional African medicine
Flora of East Tropical Africa
Flora of China
Flora of tropical Asia
Plants described in 1786